Andrew Bryant may refer to:

 Andrew Jackson Bryant (1823–1882), mayor of San Francisco, California
 Andrew S. Bryant (1841–1931), American Civil War soldier

See also
 Andrew Bryan (disambiguation)